Kamloops Chinese Cemetery is a burial ground for Chinese living in or near Kamloops, British Columbia, Canada. It opened in the 1880s.

The cemetery was created as the town's cemeteries would not accept Asians for burial.

While the cemetery is still open, the Chinatown in Kamloops it served has disappeared; it is the only surviving historic site from that community.

Other than the gazebo and newer commemorative plaques, the grave markers are made of wood.

References

Chinese Canadian
Kamloops
Cemeteries in British Columbia